The Philmont Training Center (PTC), located at the Philmont Scout Ranch near Cimarron, New Mexico, has been the National Training Center of the Boy Scouts of America (BSA) since 1950. The PTC offers week-long training conferences from June through September for council, district, and unit volunteers, BSA professionals, and youth leaders with several conferences taking place each week. The PTC also offers activities for family members including hikes throughout the week and a week-long backpacking program called a Mountain Trek for youth ages 14 to 20.

Program
Some participants and families drive to PTC, while others take a plane, chartered bus, or Amtrak to travel to the training center.   The Southwest Chief runs between Los Angeles Union Station and Chicago Union Station, and includes a station in Raton.  Participants can then take a shuttle from the Amtrak station to Philmont.  There is private plane service at Raton Municipal Airport, but there are no commercial flights there. Nearby commercial airports are the Albuquerque International Sunport airport, Denver International Airport, Colorado Springs Airport, Pueblo Memorial Airport with service to Denver, and Rick Husband Amarillo International Airport. Commercial chartered buses are available to and from the airports and some cities.

Participants and their families arrive at the PTC on Sunday and depart on the following Saturday. Meals are served in dining halls, and participants are housed in large wall tents on platforms with twin beds, electricity and a cabinet. Located near the tents are showers, restrooms, medical facilities, recreation and craft areas. Conference program fees include meals, lodging, and conference and family program materials.  During the week the participants attend a training conference while their families participate in the PTC's family programming.

Training provided
The Philmont Training Center offers adult leader training conferences for Cub Scouting, Boy Scouting,  Venturing, Order of the Arrow, Exploring, Commissioner Service, BSA training team staff, and BSA Professional employees.  There are also conferences on Serving Scouts with special needs, camp management, and STEM (Science, Technology, Engineering, Math) initiatives in Scouting.  Skills such as climbing, rappelling, COPE, shooting sports, orienteering, and wilderness first aid are also taught at the Training Center.  Various religions, such as the LDS Church, Catholic Church, and Baptist Church, hold Scouting leadership conferences at PTC.

National Advanced Youth Leadership Experience (NAYLE) is a high-intensity Boy Scout leadership course taught at Philmont. It is based on backcountry high adventure skills and began in the summer of 2006 replacing the previous National Youth Leader Instructor Camp course. The course is available to Boy Scouts age 14 through 17 who have completed their local council National Youth Leadership Training (NYLT) course and is held during six one-week sessions. Based at Philmont's Rocky Mountain Scout Camp and taught at various locations across Philmont Scout Ranch, the program hones youth leadership skills through ethical decision making and participation in Philmont Ranger backcountry training. The program is strongly grounded in the philosophy of Servant leadership.

Family programs

During the day when leaders are attending training conferences, their family members attend programs based on their age.  The Philmont Museum and Seton Memorial Library, located just down the road from PTC, and the Kit Carson Museum, located seven miles south of PTC, are open to visit and tour by the PTC family programs.  The family programs may also hike on a few of the trails located on the eastern edge of the ranch.  In the evening families gather together for dinner and evening programs including crafts, games, sing-alongs, hoedowns, western themed picnics with branding, and campfires at the beginning and end of the week.

Just like the participants on Philmont treks, PTC participants may earn the Duty to God Award with guidance from the chaplains.

History

Phillips built a large residence in the lowlands of Philmont. He turned the ranch into a private game reserve for himself and friends, and built a number of hunting lodges and day-use camps. Phillips sometimes allowed others including a few Boy Scout troops to visit his ranch. He was so impressed with the Scouts that in 1938 he donated  of his land to the Boy Scouts of America. Facilities surrounding the Villa Philmonte were built and it became the National Training Center of the Boy Scouts of America in 1950. Tours are now offered of the Villa Philmonte, as the residence is now a museum instead of being used as classrooms.

See also
 National Advanced Youth Leadership Experience
 Mortimer L. Schiff Scout Reservation

References

External links
 PTC Official Website

Philmont Scout Ranch
Education in Colfax County, New Mexico
Buildings and structures in Colfax County, New Mexico
Leadership training of the Boy Scouts of America
1950 establishments in New Mexico